Intolerance is the first solo album from Grant Hart, formerly of the band Hüsker Dü. It was released on December 12, 1989.

The album was remastered and reissued by MVD Audio in 2010 on 180 gram vinyl with new album cover art.

Track listing
All songs written by Grant Hart.

 "All Of My Senses" (5:51)
 "Now That You Know Me" (3:54)
 "Fanfare In D Major (Come, Come)" (3:45)
 "The Main" (4:04)
 "Twenty-Five Forty-One" (4:41)
 "Roller Rink" (4:23)
 "You're The Victim" (3:10)
 "Anything" (3:28)
 "She Can See The Angels Coming" (3:42)
 "Reprise" (1:43)

Personnel
 Grant Hart – vocals, instruments, production
 Chopper Black – engineering
 Tom Herbers – engineering

Notes

1989 debut albums
Grant Hart albums
SST Records albums